Daviesia ramosissima is a species of flowering plant in the family Fabaceae and is endemic to the south-west of Western Australia. It is a shrub with many branchlets, scattered, needle-like, sharply pointed phyllodes and orange-yellow and red flowers.

Description

Taxonomy
Daviesia ramosissima was first formally described in 1995 by Michael Crisp in Australian Systematic Botany from specimens collected near the Kalbarri-Ajana road in 1966. The specific epithet (ramosissima) means "very much-branched".

Distribution and habitat
This daviesia grows in kwongan on sandplains from Kalbarri National Park to near Mingenew in the Geraldton Sandplains biogeographic region of south-western Western Australia.

Conservation status 
Daviesia ramosissima is listed as "not threatened" by the Government of Western Australia Department of Biodiversity, Conservation and Attractions,

References 

ramosissima
Taxa named by Michael Crisp
Plants described in 1995
Flora of Western Australia